Susan Gordon (1949—2011) was an American child actress.

Susan Gordon may also refer to: 

Susan M. Gordon, American intelligence official
Sue Gordon (born 1943), Australian politician
Susan Montagu, Duchess of Manchester (née Susan Gordon) (1774–1828), British duchess
Susan Gordon Lydon (1943–2005), American feminist writer

See also
Suzanne Gordon, American journalist